Cyrus Dunham (born January 28, 1992) is an American writer, actor, and activist. Dunham is a published author, whose debut book, A Year Without A Name: A Memoir, was a Lambda Literary Award finalist.

Early life
Dunham was born and raised in New York City. His mother, Laurie Simmons, is an artist and photographer, and his father, Carroll Dunham, is a painter. Dunham's older sister, Lena, is a writer, actress, and producer.

Dunham attended St. Ann's School in New York City. He wrote for the school newspaper and yearbook and spoke at the graduation. As a high school student in 2009, Dunham received the Poetry Society of America's Louise Louis/Emily F. Bourne Student Poetry Award for the poem Twin Oaks, which was judged for the competition by American poet Matthew Rohrer.

Dunham graduated from Brown University with a degree in urban studies in May 2014. He was a contributing writer for the student weekly The College Hill Independent.

Career

Writing and activism
Dunham has written for The New Yorker, Artforum and Granta; as well as Transgender Herstory in 99 Objects: Legends and Mythologies at the ONE National Gay & Lesbian Archives, UNCOUNTED: Call & Response at Vienna Secession and the AL-UGH-ORIES monograph, as part of Nicole Eisenman's exhibition at the New Museum.

In 2016, Dunham published his first collection of poetry and short essays, The Fool. The publication is a free, online-only web-book published by Curse of Cherifa.

Dunham's memoir, A Year Without a Name, was published in October 2019 by Little, Brown and Company. The book was met with positive reviews from The Atlantic, Kirkus Reviews and them. A short section of the book was published online in The New Yorker.

Dunham has collaborated frequently with transgender activist Tourmaline; their work together includes public speaking, writing, and performance.

Film
Dunham's first film appearance was in the 2006 short, Dealing, as June, a 13-year-old art dealer. Dealing was written and directed by Dunham's older sister.

In 2010, Dunham starred in a second film written and directed by his sister called Tiny Furniture in which Dunham's sister and mother played characters in the film that were loosely based on their own family.

Dunham stars as Junior in the film Happy Birthday, Marsha! about the gay activist Marsha P. Johnson and transgender activist Sylvia Rivera in the hours before the Stonewall riots. Dunham also appeared in artist A.K. Burns' multi-channel video installation A Smeary Spot.

See also
 LGBT culture in New York City
 List of LGBT people from New York City
 Literature analysis

References

External links

Dunham at the New Yorker
Dunham at The College Hill Independent
thefool.us by Dunham

1992 births
Living people
21st-century American actors
Actors from New York City
American film actors
American people of English descent
The Believer (magazine) people
Brown University alumni
Jewish American actors
LGBT Jews
LGBT people from New York (state)
American LGBT poets
21st-century American writers
21st-century American male writers
Transgender Jews
Saint Ann's School (Brooklyn) alumni
Writers from Brooklyn
American non-binary actors
LGBT memoirists
Transgender non-binary people
Non-binary activists
21st-century American Jews
21st-century LGBT people
American non-binary writers